Peter Douglas Brown (born 7 June 1925) is an historian of eighteenth-century British politics.

Brown was born in London on 7 June 1925. He was educated at Harrow School and Balliol College, Oxford. He is a Fellow of the Royal Historical Society. On 24 March 1982, he chaired a meeting to celebrate the 150th anniversary of the Great Reform Act at the Reform Club.

Works
The Chathamites: A Study in the Relationship between Personalities and Ideas in the Second Half of the Eighteenth Century (London: Macmillan, 1967). 
William Pitt, Earl of Chatham: The Great Commoner (London: Allen & Unwin, 1978). 
(editor, with Karl W. Schweizer), The Devonshire Diary. William Cavendish, Fourth Duke of Devonshire. Memoranda on State Affairs, 1759–1762 (London: The Royal Historical Society, 1982).

References

1925 births
Possibly living people
Alumni of Balliol College, Oxford
Fellows of the Royal Historical Society
People educated at Harrow School